Myriophyllum aquaticum is a flowering plant, a vascular dicot, commonly called parrot's-feather and parrot feather watermilfoil.

Morphology and reproduction
Parrot feather is a perennial plant. Parrot feather gets its name from its feather-like leaves that are arranged around the stem in whorls of four to six. The emergent stems and leaves are the most distinctive trait of parrot feather, as they can grow up to a foot above the water surface and look almost like small fir trees. The woody emergent stems grow over 5 feet long and will extend to the bank and shore. Attached to the Parrot feather are pinkish-white flowers that extend approximately 1/16 inches long. As the water warms in the spring, parrot feather begins to flourish. Most plants flower in the spring; however, some also flower in the fall. Almost all plants of this species are female, in fact there are no male plants found outside of South America. Seeds are not produced in any North American plants. Parrot feather reproduces asexually. New plants grow from fragments of already rooted plants. The plant has whorls of feathery blue-green to waxy gray-green leaves deeply cut into many narrow lobes.

Kasselmann recently described a new variety, M. aquaticum var. santacatarinense, which distinguishes itself from the typical variety by its more stiff and robust habitus and pinnae that are fewer and broader.

Habitat
Parrot feather is native to the Amazon River in South America, but it can now be found on every continent except Antarctica. It is thought that this plant was introduced to North America around the late 1800s. It was first discovered in the United States in the 1890s in Washington, D.C. Parrot's feather typically grows in freshwater streams, ponds, lakes, rivers, and canals that have a high nutrient content. During the 20th century it colonized areas in South Africa, Japan, England, New Zealand, and Australia. As it prefers a warmer climate, it is chiefly found in the southern parts of the United States.

Use and spread
Parrot feather is now used for indoor and outdoor aquatic use. It is a popular plant in aquatic gardens. It spreads easily and has become an invasive species and a noxious weed in many areas. The plant can be introduced to new areas when sections of its rhizome are dug up and moved. In Florida in the United States, flea beetles have been found to use parrot feather as a host for their larvae.

Problems
Because of its attractiveness and ease of cultivation, parrot feather has been introduced worldwide for use in indoor and outdoor aquaria. It is also a popular aquatic garden plant. However, it has escaped cultivation and spread via plant fragments and intentional plantings. While parrot feather may provide cover for some aquatic organisms, it can seriously change the physical and chemical characteristics of lakes and streams. The parrot feather grows abundantly, shades out naturally occurring algae, and clogs irrigation ducts and canals. The Parrot feather typically exist in bundles and extend out of the water. In large numbers, the plants make a dense mat on the water's surface. Because of this, they shade the water from sunlight and cause native plants to die because of light deficiency. The organisms that feed on the native plants can die off due to starvation. The dense mats also cause problems for recreation. Swimmers and boat propellers can become entangled. The mats are also a breeding ground for mosquitos.

Cleanup efforts
Herbicides have not been found very useful in controlling its growth, partly because the plant has a waxy cuticle that seals out the poison. Cutting and chopping can actually promote the plant's spread. In the U.S. states of Alabama, Connecticut, Massachusetts, Maine, Vermont, and Washington, parrot feather is a declared noxious weed and is therefore banned from sale.

The two main solutions to manage this aquatic nuisance is physically removing the plant and or using herbicides.

The physical aspects of removal are such acts of cutting, harvesting, and rotovation (underwater rototilling). These methods see best results only when the extent of the infestation has taken over all available niches. Best results are seen this way due to the availability of space as compared to rapid growth. Using physical control methods while the plant is still invading will tend to enhance its rate of spread.

Another method of controlling Parrots feather is by the usage of herbicides. The herbicides are effective to the plant part exposed above water. The plant parts beneath the water never come fully into contact with the herbicides and are therefore washed away. Herbicides are most effective when applied to young growing plants. They should be applied repeatedly to show maximum results. M. aquaticum is more difficult to control with herbicides than other aquatic species. The leaves are protected by a thick waxy coating, and in order for herbicides to penetrate the leaves, surfactants must be added; however, herbicides may impact non-target native plants or animals.

In the United Kingdom, this plant is one of five introduced aquatic plants which are to be banned from sale from April 2014. This is the first ban of its kind in the country.

In Europe, Parrot feather is included since 2016 in the list of Invasive Alien Species of Union concern (the Union list). This implies that this species cannot be imported, cultivated, transported, commercialized, planted, or intentionally released into the environment in the whole of the European Union.

References

External links

Jepson Manual Treatment
Berkeley Botany Photo of the Day
Texas Invasives
Pacific Island Ecosystems at Risk
Invasive Plant Atlas of the Midsouth
Photo gallery

aquaticum
Freshwater plants
Flora of the Amazon
Plants described in 1825